Francisca Linoska Campos Salas (born July 19, 1985 in Antofagasta) is a female cyclist from Chile, specializing in competitive mountain biking.

Campos represented her native South American country at the 2008 Summer Olympics, where she finished in 25th place in the final rankings of the women's cross-country race. In 2003, she claimed the bronze medal at the Pan American Games in Santo Domingo, Dominican Republic, behind Argentina's Jimena Florit (gold) and USA's Mary McConneloug (silver).

Campos started her biking career at the age of 10. Soon she participated in national championships and can look back on impressive successes:

- 9 podiums in Panamerican Championships in Mountain Bike.

- 10 times national champion in Mountain Bike and 4 times in Road.

- 3rd place in a Mountain Bike World Cup.

- 3rd place in Tour de France du VTT

- raced for 3 International Mountain Bike Teams.

- the youngest rider in the Olympic Games in Beijing 2008.

- visited 25 countries by racing bike: Argentina, Bolivia, Ecuador, Brazil, Colombia, Venezuela, Puerto Rico, Dominican Republic, Netherlands Antilles, Mexico, USA, Canada, Spain, Andorra, France, Belgium, Switzerland, Germany, Great Britain, Austria, Italy, Slovenia, New Zealand, Philippines and China.

References

1985 births
Living people
Chilean female cyclists
Cross-country mountain bikers
Cyclists at the 2008 Summer Olympics
Cyclists at the 2003 Pan American Games
Cyclists at the 2007 Pan American Games
Olympic cyclists of Chile
People from Antofagasta
Pan American Games bronze medalists for Chile
Pan American Games medalists in cycling
Medalists at the 2003 Pan American Games
20th-century Chilean women
21st-century Chilean women